Dominik Landertinger (born 13 March 1988) is a retired Austrian biathlete.

Life and career
Landertinger debuted in the 2007–08 season, and his big breakthrough came during the 2008–09 season, where he, as of 22 March 2015, has fourteen podium finishes, including a gold medal in the 15 km mass start at the 2009 World Championships in Pyeongchang and a win in the 15 km mass start in Khanty-Mansiysk at the last round of the 2009–10 season. He also finished second in the men's relay in the same World Championships, alongside Daniel Mesotitsch, Simon Eder and Christoph Sumann.

He represented Austria at the 2010 Winter Olympics, 2014 Winter Olympics, and 2018 Winter Olympics. He has won 4 medals: silver in the Men's relay in 2010, a silver and a bronze in the Men's sprint and in the Men's relay in 2014, and a bronze in the Men's individual in 2018. Both of the relays together with Daniel Mesotitsch, Simon Eder and Christoph Sumann.

Biathlon results
All results are sourced from the International Biathlon Union.

Olympic Games
4 medals (2 silver, 2 bronze)

*The mixed relay was added as an event in 2014.

World Championships
5 medals (1 gold, 2 silver, 2 bronze)

*During Olympic seasons competitions are only held for those events not included in the Olympic program.

Junior/Youth World Championships
4 medals (1 gold, 2 silver, 1 bronze)

Individual victories
2 victories (2 MS) 
 
*Results are from UIPMB and IBU races which include the Biathlon World Cup, Biathlon World Championships and the Winter Olympic Games.

References

External links
 

1988 births
Living people
People from Braunau am Inn
Austrian male biathletes
Biathletes at the 2010 Winter Olympics
Biathletes at the 2014 Winter Olympics
Biathletes at the 2018 Winter Olympics
Olympic biathletes of Austria
Medalists at the 2010 Winter Olympics
Medalists at the 2014 Winter Olympics
Medalists at the 2018 Winter Olympics
Olympic medalists in biathlon
Olympic silver medalists for Austria
Olympic bronze medalists for Austria
Biathlon World Championships medalists
Sportspeople from Upper Austria